The Aruá language of South America may refer to:
 Arawá language (Arawan family)
 Aruáshi language (Tupian family)
 Aroã language (Arawakan family)